Two human polls comprised the 1972 NCAA University Division football rankings. Unlike most sports, college football's governing body, the NCAA, does not bestow a national championship, instead that title is bestowed by one or more different polling agencies. There are two main weekly polls that begin in the preseason—the AP Poll and the Coaches Poll.

Legend

AP Poll

UPI Coaches Poll

The final UPI Coaches Poll was released prior to the bowl games, in early December.
USC was a unanimous selection, with all 35 first-place votes.

 Prior to the 1975 season, the Big Ten and Pac-8 conferences allowed only one postseason participant each, for the Rose Bowl.

Notes

References

College football rankings